Kildare Castle is a ruined castle located at Kildare in  County Kildare, Ireland. Built in the 12th century as a motte and bailey castle by Richard de Clare, 2nd Earl of Pembroke. The remains of a tower are the only above ground remains of the castle.

External links

Castles in County Kildare
Ruined castles in Ireland
Ruins in the Republic of Ireland
De Vesci family